Perfect Score is an American game show in which contestants attempt to choose the most compatible person for themselves from a group of ten strangers based solely on first impressions and short questions in hopes of earning $50,000. The series premiered on The CW on July 16, 2013.

Two contestants, usually friends, take turns eliminating individuals of the opposite gender whom they feel they are not compatible with. Each person of the opposite gender is assigned a dollar value for each contestant based on a compatibility test they took before the game began; higher dollar values indicate a higher compatibility, and lower dollar values indicate a lower compatibility. These values range from $50,000 to $1. When three individuals remain, the two contestants choose which of the three they feel they are most compatible with. The contestant who selects the individual with a higher dollar value wins both the money and a date with the person they selected.

Episodes

Episode 1: I Need a Hero
First aired July 16, 2013

Episode 2: It's a Bromance, Bro
First aired July 16, 2013

Episode 3: The Rules of Love
First aired July 23, 2013

Episode 4: Banking on Love
First aired August 16, 2013

Episode 5: We've Got Spirit, Yes We Do
First aired August 16, 2013

Episode 6: Married by 30
First aired August 23, 2013

Episode 7: Strike a Pose
First aired August 30, 2013

Episode 8: Beauty Queen Battles
First aired September 6, 2013

Episode 9: Pillow Fight!
First aired September 6, 2013

Episode 10: Dress to Impress
First aired September 13, 2013

Episode 11: It's Raining Men
First aired September 20, 2013

Episode 12: Catch of the Day
First aired September 27, 2013

Overseas version 
Foreign version aired on Indonesia as Perfect Score Indonesia and was first broadcast on 16 November 2013 on MNCTV and has the slogan "Pilihan Tepat, Jutaan Nilainya!" (The Right Choice, Its worth Millions!), with the host Robby Purba and Amanda Zevannya.

In Vietnam, it was titled Điểm số hoàn hảo (Perfect Score) and broadcast 53 shows in Ho Chi Minh City Television from 28 May 2015 to 26 May 2016. Huy Khánh and Huỳnh Ngân are the hosts. 25,000,000₫ is the grand prize.

References 

The CW original programming
2010s American game shows
2013 American television series debuts
Television series by Fremantle (company)
2013 American television series endings